Kari Skjønsberg (17 January 1926 – 6 January 2003) was a Norwegian academic, writer and feminist.

Biography
She was born in Oslo, Norway. She worked on the Saturday Children's Hour (Lørdagsbarnetimen) on  NRK  radio during the 1940s. In the 1950s, she was a literary critic for Arbeiderbladet and Verdens Gang. She graduated in 1953 with a dissertation on the development of Norwegian children's stories. She was Associate Professor of children's literature at the State Library College (Statens bibliotekhøgskole) (now Oslo and Akershus University College) from 1968 to 1994 and served as president of the Norwegian Association for Women's Rights from 1972 to 1978. She also wrote a number of books on children's literature. 

Kari Skjønsberg prize  (Kari Skjønsberg-prisen)  was established in 1996 and was first awarded in 1997. It was established to promote research on children's and youth literature. It is awarded annually by the Department of Journalism, Library and Information Studies by  Oslo and Akershus University College. Kari Skjønsberg died in 2003 and was buried at Vestre gravlund in Oslo.

Bibliography 
 Historie og samfunn : åtte artikler 1956-1991. Oslo, 1995. 
 Kjønnsroller og leserroller : åtte artikler 1962-1992 . Oslo, 1995. 
 7 papers on children's literature 1985-1994 : in English, Deutsch, Français . Oslo, 1995. 
 Ti artikler om barne- og ungdomslitteratur 1973-1993. Oslo, 1993. 
 «Norsk barnelitteratur på 1800-tallet» I: (Finlands barnboksinstitut. Skrifter ; 3). 
 Hvor var kvinnene? : elleve kvinner om årene 1945-1960. Gyldendal, 1979
 Hvem forteller? : om adaptasjoner i barnelitteratur. Tiden, 1979. 
 Fernanda Nissen. Tiden, 1978 
 Kjønnsrollemønster i skandinaviske barne- og ungdomsbøker. København : Gyldendal, 1977.  
 Camilla Collett. Tiden, 1976 
 Gavnlige og morende Fortællinger for Børn : Et utvalg av eldre norsk barnelitteratur. Samlet og presentert av Kari Skjønsberg. Aschehoug, 1974. 
 Mannssamfunnet midt imot. Norsk kvinnesaksdebatt gjennom tre «mannsaldre». En antologi ved Kari Skjønsberg.  Gyldendal, 1974 
 Kjønnsroller, miljø og sosial lagdeling i barnelitteraturen. Universitetsforlaget, 1972

References

1926 births
2003 deaths
Academic staff of Oslo and Akershus University College
Norwegian women's rights activists
Norwegian feminists
20th-century Norwegian writers
20th-century Norwegian women writers
Burials at Vestre gravlund
Norwegian Association for Women's Rights people